There are 120 listed buildings (Swedish: byggnadsminne) in Kalmar County.

Borgholm Municipality

Emmaboda Municipality

Hultsfred Municipality

Högsby Municipality

Kalmar Municipality

Mönsterås Municipality

Mörbylånga Municipality
placeholder

Nybro Municipality

Oskarshamn Municipality

Torsås Municipality

Vimmerby Municipality

Västervik Municipality

External links

  Bebyggelseregistret

Listed buildings in Sweden